The Mayhew Prize is a prize awarded annually by the Faculty of Mathematics, University of Cambridge to the student showing the greatest distinction in applied mathematics, primarily for courses offered by DAMTP, but also for some courses offered by the Statistical Laboratory, in the MASt examinations, also known as Part III of the Mathematical Tripos.  This includes about half of all students taking the MASt examinations, since the rest are taking mainly pure mathematics courses, and so winning the Mayhew Prize is not equivalent to obtaining the highest mark on the MASt examinations.  Since 2018 the Faculty have also awarded the Pure Mathematics Prize for pure mathematics, but due to an absence of funds there is no equivalent monetary reward.

The Mayhew Prize was founded in 1923 through a donation of £500 by William Loudon Mollison, Master of Clare College, in memory of his wife Ellen Mayhew (1846-1917).

List of winners

Most of this list is from The Times newspaper archive. The winners of the prize are published in the Cambridge University Reporter.

See also

 List of mathematics awards

References

Faculty of Mathematics, University of Cambridge
Mathematics awards